The 2011–12 season was the 78th season in Granada CF's history and their 18th season in La Liga, the top division of Spanish football.  It covered a period from 1 July 2011 to 30 June 2012.

Granada finished the season in 17th place in the league, managing to stay in the top flight of the Spanish football. It entered the Copa del Rey in the Round of 32 where it lost to Real Sociedad 3–5 on aggregate.

Players

Squad information

Out on loan

Club

Coaching staff

Team stats

Las updated: 21 December 2011Source:

Pre-season

Friendlies

Competitions

La Liga

League table

Results summary

Results by round

Matches

Copa del Rey

Round of 32

See also

 2011–12 Copa del Rey
 2011–12 La Liga

References

External links
  

Spanish football clubs 2011–12 season
Granada CF seasons